Novoabdrakhmanovo (Yañı Abdraxman) is a rural locality (a village) in Pervomaysky Selsoviet, Sterlitamaksky District, Bashkortostan, Russia. The population was 38 as of 2010. There is 1 street.

Geography 
Novoabdrakhmanovo is located 52 km northwest of Sterlitamak (the district's administrative centre) by road. Abdrakhmanovo is the nearest rural locality.

References 

Rural localities in Sterlitamaksky District